Marko Kraljević may refer to:

 Prince Marko (c. 1335 – 1395), Serbian king from 1371 to 1395
 Marko Kraljević (footballer) (born 1965), German-Croat footballer